Xylota armipes is a species of hoverfly in the family Syrphidae.

Distribution
Taiwan.

References

Eristalinae
Insects described in 1922
Diptera of Asia
Taxa named by Pius Sack